East Jutland metropolitan area is a potential metropolitan area in Jutland and Funen, Denmark. 
 Aarhus is the most populated city in the region.

The National Planning Report of 2006, published by the Danish Environment Ministry, argued that “East Jutland is developing into a coherent area with high population growth and division of labour between the cities in the urban band that extends from Kolding to Randers” and foresaw “the contours of a future million-city”. The report recommended dialogue about future development between the state, the region and the municipalities.

In the next National Planning Report of 2013, the area was split into East Jutland North and the Triangle Region. The municipalities in the two subregions cooperate as Business Region Aarhus and the Triangle Region respectively.

With about 1.4 million people living in the area, it represents approximately 25% of the population of Denmark.
The area has 19 municipalities as of 2016.

Economy

The metropolitan area is a major hub for education and is home to many large companies; in particular in the sectors of food production, agriculture, renewable energy and green tech. Major companies include Vestas Wind Systems A/S and Arla Foods. Vestas is a Danish manufacturer, seller, installer, and servicer of wind turbines and the largest in the world of its kind; and Arla is a Swedish-Danish dairy cooperative with headquarters in Aarhus and is the largest producer of dairy products in Scandinavia and the seventh largest dairy company in the world, measured by turnover. Among cooperative dairy companies, Arla is the third largest in the world.

The primary harbour of the region is Aarhus harbour. It is the largest industrial harbour in Denmark and among largest in Northern Europe, only surpassed by the Swedish industrial harbour in Gothenburg in the Kattegat sea area. With modern facilities, it handles approximately 12 million tonnes of cargo (2006) per year and is therefore among the 100 biggest container ports in the world.

Greater Aarhus boasts a unique position in the global wind energy market. It is home to some of the world's biggest manufacturers of wind turbines and constitutes the world's most advanced knowledge center. An array of suppliers and subcontractors, covers the entire supply chain and the sector benefits from a solid political backing of wind energy on local, regional and national level. The wind business cluster here has a long legacy of cooperation between manufacturers, suppliers, scientific communities and public authorities. As a knowledge hub and gathering point for the wind industry, Aarhus is likely to play a vital role in developing the wind energy systems of the future:

· 87% of Denmark's combined turnover from wind energy is generated by businesses in the Greater Aarhus area

· 53% of Denmark's high-skill wind employees work in the Greater Aarhus area

· 57% of all top executives in the Danish wind industry work in the Greater Aarhus area

· 14,000 employees in the Danish wind industry work within Central Region Denmark – 11,000 of them within one hour drive from Aarhus.

Colleges and universities

Notable universities and educational institutions within the area includes:

Aarhus University
University of Southern Denmark
Aarhus School of Architecture
Aarhus School of Business
Aarhus Technical College
Engineering College of Aarhus
The Danish School of Journalism
VIA University College

Infrastructure

There are two primary commercial international airports serving the area:
Aarhus Airport (in the north)
Billund Airport (in the south)

The area has several motorways but the European route E45 goes from the south to the north and is central to the area's growth.

Statistics

The core area around Aarhus is the most populated area in East Jutland, and that area is much smaller in km² - 6,182 km² - (2386 sq. mi) and with a population of more than one million.

The figures below are for the core area centered on Aarhus and most populous area in the East Jutland metropolitan area as of 1 January 2016.

The figures below are for the whole East Jutland metropolitan area as of 1 January 2016.

Subregions 
In the National Planning Report of 2013, the term East Jutland metropolitan area was replaced by the two subregions of East Jutland North and the Triangle Region. The municipalities of the two subregions cooperate as Business Region Aarhus and the Triangle Region.

Business Region Aarhus 
Business Region Aarhus is a partnership between the 12 municipalities of Favrskov, Hedensted, Horsens, Norddjurs, Odder, Randers, Samsø, Silkeborg, Skanderborg, Syddjurs, Viborg, and Aarhus, all in the Central Denmark Region. The partnership began in 1994, before the Danish municipal reform of 2007. The region originally formed the northernmost part of the East Jutland metropolitan area and Samsø Municipality, but since 24 February 2016, Viborg municipality was also included. The Aarhus area was classified in a 2005 ESPON (European Spatial Planning Observation Network) report as a Category 3 MEGA. MEGAs are Metropolitan European Growth Areas, of which the report identified 76 in Europe.

The term Greater Aarhus is used indistinctly in various contexts, but according to Aarhus Municipality it includes the 9 municipalities of Aarhus, Randers, Norddjurs, Syddjurs, Viborg, Silkeborg, Odder, Horsens and Samsø.

Triangle Region  

The Triangle Region is a partnership between the 7 municipalities of Billund, Fredericia, Haderslev, Kolding, Middelfart, Vejen and Vejle, all in the Southern Denmark Region. Kolding is the most populated town in the Triangle Region.

Gallery 
Towns

Landscapes and nature

See also
Metropolitan areas of Denmark
Largest urban areas in the Nordic countries

Sources 

  Historical account on the foundation and establishment of the region.
  Account and discussion on the idea of an East Jutland Metropolis (2006 to 2017).
 
 
 
 
 
 

https://web.archive.org/web/20070930143249/http://www.frinet.dk/infrastruktur2030

References

External links 
, from 2010-2016

Metropolitan areas of Denmark